Jaera albifrons is a species of isopod in the family Janiridae. It is found in Europe and North America.

References

External links

 

Asellota
Crustaceans of the Atlantic Ocean
Taxa named by William Elford Leach
Crustaceans described in 1814
Articles created by Qbugbot